is a professional Go player.

Biography 
Before becoming a professional, Sakai was majoring in medical science at Kyoto University. For a long time, Sakai was the strongest amateur player in Japan, and when he won the World Amateur Go Championship in 2000, the Kansai Ki-in awarded him professional 5 dan (after defeating two 5 dan and two 7 dan players). He was also the first player in Japan to be awarded a special 8 dan (amateur) diploma. In 2003, he won the biggest Kansai Ki-in tournament, the Kansai Ki-in Championship. In 2004, he was runner-up for the Shinjin-O title, losing to Mizokami Tomochika two games to one (losing both by half point). He is currently active in various tournament leagues for both the Nihon Ki-in (participation in Meijin league 2005–present) and the Kansai Ki-in.

In 2010, Sakai won the Gosei title, defeating title-holder Cho U 3–2.

Titles and runners-up

External links
GoBase Profile
Sensei's Library Profile
Kansai Ki-in Profile (Japanese)

1973 births
Japanese Go players
Living people
Sportspeople from Hyōgo Prefecture
Kyoto University alumni